Kentucky Route 152 (KY 152) is a  state highway in Kentucky that runs from KY 49 north of Loretto to U.S. Route 27 (US 27) and Galilee Road north of Bryantsville via Springfield, Mackville, Harrodsburg, and Burgin.

Major intersections

Marion Co + US 150 Bus. Overlap +
Washington County = 46.561

References

0152
Kentucky Route 152
Kentucky Route 152
Kentucky Route 152
Kentucky Route 152